Montgomery Township, Ohio may refer to:
Montgomery Township, Ashland County, Ohio
Montgomery Township, Marion County, Ohio
Montgomery Township, Wood County, Ohio

See also
Montgomery Township (disambiguation)

Ohio township disambiguation pages